The General Intercessions or Universal Prayer or Prayer of the Faithful are a series of prayers which form part of the liturgy in the Catholic, Lutheran, Anglican, Methodist and other Western Liturgical Churches.

History
The Christian custom of offering such prayers, perhaps in line with Jewish tradition, is rooted in Scripture:

The practice is witnessed to by Justin Martyr and Augustine of Hippo, and by the fourth century, the Roman Rite had a set of nine Solemn Prayers of Intercession of the kind now preserved only in the Good Friday at the same point of Liturgy at which the ordinary General Intercessions are prayed.

The General Intercessions dropped out of use, leaving only the introductory greeting "Dominus vobiscum" and the invitation "Oremus" (followed by no particular prayer) that in the Tridentine Mass the priest said when about to begin the Offertory. They were one of the elements that the Second Vatican Council referred to when decreeing in  Sacrosanctum Concilium, 50: "Other parts which suffered loss through accidents of history are to be restored to the vigour they had in the days of the holy Fathers, as may seem useful or necessary".

In the Ambrosian Rite, the prayer of the faithful has been in vigour for some occasions also before the Second Vatican Council, with the Ambrosian chant for the offertory Dicamus omnes.

Practice by Christian denomination

Catholicism

This prayer is said at the conclusion of the Liturgy of the Word or Mass of the Catechumens (the older term). The General Instruction of the Roman Missal states:

The prayer is introduced by the celebrating priest.  A deacon, another member of the congregation, or the priest himself recites a number of intentions, and the people respond with a short invocation such as "Lord, hear our prayer." The prayer is concluded with a final oration by the priest and all responding "Amen."

Anglicanism and Methodism

Use in the praying of the canonical hours
Similar sets of prayers are said in the Liturgy of the Hours after the canticles of the Benedictus and the Magnificat at Lauds and Vespers (Morning and Evening Prayer). Referred to as the Intercessions, they are similarly introduced by an introductory phrase, but end with the recitation of the Lord's Prayer before the person presiding over the celebration recites the concluding prayer.

References

Order of Mass